Error (commonly stylised as ERROR) is a Hong Kong Cantopop boy band formed through ViuTV's reality talent show Good Night Show - King Maker in 2018. The group consists of 4 members: Leung Yip, Dee Ho, Denis Kwok, and Poki Ng. The group debuted on 2 December 2018 with the single "404".

Career

2018–2020: Formation and early years 
In July 2018, ViuTV's reality talent competition Good Night Show - King Maker started scouting for potential artistes. After the final, 12 of the 99 contestants were selected by ViuTV to form a boy band Mirror, but the third runner-up Leung Yip (Fatboy) was not selected. Later, the television station published online a series of short videos titled Fatboy's Big Adventure (肥仔大冒險), depicting how Leung Yip recruited his fellow contestants to form another group. The final and seventh episode of the series, published on 2 December 2018, showed Leung Yip, Denis Kwok (193), Dee Ho and Poki Ng declaring the formation of Error. The group demonstrated their comedian position with their debut single "404", which is a parody of Mirror's "In a Second" (一秒間).

In 2019, the group released two singles, namely "Kill My Manager" (殺死我的經理人) and "We Are Not Broken" (我們不碎). They also hosted their first television show  with their manager . In October of the same year, Error hosted their first stand-up comedy show in Macpherson Stadium. They released a single called "Handsome Guys" (我們很帥) the following year, which they gained their first peak chart position in RTHK.

2021–2022: Rising popularity 
Error released two singles, "I Promise" and "We Don't Chok" (我們不Chok) in 2021. They also hosted a reality pageant show,  in March, and each member led a team in the contest. This drew comments from ViuTV's competitor, TVB's deputy general manager Eric Tsang, who dismissed ViuTV for its low viewership and the show for being a niche. On 11 April, before the airing of the final, Denis Kwok sarcastically rebutted Tsang's comments; it became a boost in his popularity, as well as the group's. In May, Error's reality show  was the rage in Hong Kong, the server of ViuTV's website even faced technical problems during the upload of last episode due to the traffic to the website.

Members

Discography

Filmography

Dramas

Variety Shows

Films

Awards and nominations

References

External links 

 EREOR on MakerVille
 
 
 

Hong Kong boy bands
Cantopop musical groups
Musical groups established in 2018
2018 establishments in Hong Kong
Musical quartets
Hong Kong male comedians
King Maker contestants
MakerVille artists